Franca: Chaos and Creation is a 2016 documentary film directed by Francesco Carrozzini. The film focuses on his mother Franca Sozzani, editor-in-chief of Vogue Italia for nearly three decades, and highlights her groundbreaking influence on fashion editorials while also exploring the relationship between Sozzani and Carrozzini as mother and son. The film premiered on September 2, 2016 in the "Cinema nel Giardino" category at the 73rd Venice International Film Festival where it received early positive reviews from the fashion industry. It hosted its North American premiere during the 24th Hamptons International Film Festival in October 2016
and also screened at AFI Fest in Los Angeles on November 15, 2016. The film was picked up for distribution in the US by Bond/360. In September 2017, Carrozzini announced that the film will receive a special release in Italy on September 25–27, 2017 as part of Fashion Film Festival Milano and be available to stream worldwide on Netflix starting in October 2017.

Synopsis
When Franca Sozzani took over as editor-in-chief of Vogue Italia at the end of the 80s, she started a fashion revolution. Shunning the conventional magazine covers and fashion spreads of the time, she explored subjects that had previously been off-limits. By skillfully mixing fashion, high concept art, and photography, she created some of the most iconic magazine covers of the past 25 years. Through interviews with some of her closest collaborators and friends, including Karl Lagerfeld, Bruce Weber, Baz Luhrmann, Courtney Love and others, director Francesco Carrozzini delivers an intimate portrait of his mother and a candid look at one of the most influential names in fashion.

Cast

 Franca Sozzani
 Francesco Carrozzini
 Valentino
 Giancarlo Giammetti
 Deborah Turbeville
 Arianna Huffington
 Suzy Menkes
 Valerie Steele
 Jonathan Newhouse
 Farida Khelfa
 Bernard Henri-Levy
 Donatella Versace
 Baz Luhrmann
 Bruce Weber
 Peter Lindbergh
 Paolo Roversi
 Karl Lagerfeld
 André Leon Talley
 Courtney Love
 Naomi Campbell
 Marina Abramović
 Daphne Guinness
 Jeff Koons
 Azzedine Alaïa

Accolades
In March 2017, director Francesco Carrozzini was presented with a Nastro d'Argento (Silver Ribbon) from the Italian National Syndicate of Film Journalists.

References

External links
 Official website
 

2016 films
2016 documentary films
Documentary films about women
Films about fashion
2016 directorial debut films